Notoscincus is a genus of skinks. They are commonly known as soil-crevice skinks or snake-eyed skinks.

Species
Notoscincus butleri Storr, 1979 – lined soil-crevice skink
Notoscincus ornatus (Broom, 1896) – ornate soil-crevice skink

Nota bene: A binomial authority in parentheses indicates that the species was originally described in a genus other than Notoscincus.

References

Further reading
Fuhn IE (1969). "Revision and redefinition of the genus Ablepharus Lichtenstein, 1823 (Reptilia, Scincidae)". Revue Roumaine de Biologie, Zoologie 14: 23–41. (Notoscincus, new genus).

External links
More research can be found at:
http://srs.embl-heidelberg.de:8000/srs5bin/cgi-bin/wgetz?%5BREPTILIA-Species:Notoscincus*%5D
http://www.museum.wa.gov.au/faunabase/_asp_bin/CheckListcx.asp?d=Reptiles#72

Notoscincus
Lizard genera
Skinks of Australia
Taxa named by Ion Eduard Fuhn